Bénézet (Benedict, Benezet, Benet, Benoît; c. 1163 – 1184) was a saint of the Catholic Church.

Biography
Christian tradition states that he was a shepherd boy who saw a vision during an eclipse in 1177 which led him to build a bridge over the Rhône River at Avignon.

He was told that angels would watch over his flocks in his absence.  He built the bridge single-handedly; ecclesiastical and civil authorities refused to help him. Bénézet, it is said, lifted a huge stone into place, and announced it would be the start of the foundation.  This would become the Pont Saint-Bénézet.

According to the legend, there were shouts of "Miracle! Miracle!" when Bénézet had laid the first stone.  Eighteen miracles occurred in total: the blind had their vision restored, the deaf could hear again, cripples could walk; and hunchbacks had their backs straightened. Bénézet thus won support for his project from wealthy sponsors who, it is claimed, formed themselves into the Bridge-Building Brotherhood to fund its construction.

Veneration
After his death, Bénézet was interred on the bridge itself, in a small chapel dedicated to Saint Nicholas, patron saint of mariners, standing on one of the bridge's surviving piers on the Avignon side.  His relics were enshrined there until 1669, when a flood washed away part of the bridge.  His coffin, recovered, was opened and the body of Bénézet was found to be incorrupt.  The relics were translated to Avignon Cathedral and thence to the Celestine church of Saint Didier. The remains of the bridge are still a pilgrimage site.

See also
List of Catholic saints

References

External links

Saints of April 14: Bénézet 
Bénézet
 L'histoire du Pont St Bénezet

Medieval French saints
1163
1184 deaths
12th-century Christian saints
Incorrupt saints